José Soriano may refer to:
 José Soriano (baseball) (born 1998), Dominican baseball player
 José Soriano (footballer) (1917–2011), Peruvian football goalkeeper
 Pepe Soriano (born 1929 as José Carlos Soriano), Argentine actor